Kisii School for Deaf Children is Kenya's only Deaf-run and deaf-led school for deaf children. Founded by Peter Ogango, the school is based in Kisii town, the capital of Kisii County in southwestern Kenya.

References

Schools for the deaf in Kenya
Education in Nyanza Province
Special schools in Kenya